Sanaj (also Romanized as Sanāj and Senāj; also known as Sināj) is a village in Khorram Dasht Rural District, in the Central District of Famenin County, Hamadan Province, Iran. At the 2006 census, its population was 746, in 178 families.

References 

Populated places in Famenin County